The 2006 Silverstone GP2 Series round was a GP2 Series motor race held on 10 and 11 June 2006 at Silverstone Circuit, United Kingdom. It was the sixth round of the 2006 GP2 Series season. The race weekend supported the 2006 British Grand Prix.

Classification

Qualifying

Feature race

Sprint race

References

Silverstone
GP2